Samisa Passauralu Ivilla (1924–1995) was an Inuit sculptor.

His work is included in the collections of the National Gallery of Canada, the Winnipeg Art Gallery, the Musée national des beaux-arts du Québec and the Schumiatcher Collection at the University of Regina.

References

20th-century Canadian sculptors
Inuit sculptors
1924 births
1995 deaths
Canadian male sculptors
20th-century Canadian male artists